The "College Township" was an area of land in Ohio in which Miami University was built.

College Township may also refer to:
College Township, Knox County, Ohio
College Township, Centre County, Pennsylvania